J. F. Fitzgerald was commanding the forces at Bombay from 1838 to 14 February 1840.

References

Year of birth missing
Year of death missing
Commanders-in-chief of Bombay